Melittia snowii is a moth of the family Sesiidae. It is known from the United States, including Arizona.

The wingspan is about 23 mm.

The larvae feed on Cucurbita foetidissima.

References

External links
mothphotographersgroup

Sesiidae
Moths described in 1882